Dzhamaladin Gasanov (born 5 August 1964, Levashi, Republic of Dagestan) is a Russian political figure and deputy of the 5th, 6th, and 8th State Dumas. In 2021, he was granted a Doctor of Sciences in Political Science degree 

In 1994, he was appointed assistant to the Prime Minister of the Stavropol Krai. In 1999, he became an adviser on economic issues, then deputy plenipotentiary representative of the President of the Russian Federation in the Stavropol Territory. In 2004, he became the Head of the Inspectorate for Control over Non-Tax Revenues and Sources of Internal Financing of the Accounts Chamber of Russia. In 2007, he was elected deputy of the Duma of Stavropol Krai of the 4th convocation. The same year he was elected deputy of the 5th State Duma; he ran with the Liberal Democratic Party of Russia. From 2016 to 2019, he was Assistant to Deputy Chairman of the Federation Council Ilyas Umakhanov. In March 2019, he was appointed Permanent Representative of the Republic of Dagestan to the President of the Russian Federation. Since September 2021, he has served as a deputy of the 8th State Duma.

References

1964 births
Living people
United Russia politicians
21st-century Russian politicians
Eighth convocation members of the State Duma (Russian Federation)
20th-century Russian people